Landee is a surname. Notable people with the surname include:

Donn Landee, American record producer and recording engineer
Frank A. Landee (1852–1917), American businessman and politician

See also
Lande (surname)
Lander (surname)